There are 19 Grade I listed buildings in the City of Coventry. In the United Kingdom, a listed building is a building or structure of special historical or architectural importance. These buildings are legally protected from demolition, as well as from any extensions or alterations that would adversely affect the building's character or destroy historic features. Listed buildings in England and Wales are divided into three categories—Grade II buildings are buildings of special interest; Grade II* buildings are Grade II buildings of particular interest; and Grade I buildings, which are those of "exceptional" interest. Only around four per cent of listed buildings are given Grade I status.

Coventry is an ancient city and a metropolitan borough in the West Midlands of England. The city's history dates back to at least the 11th century (CE), and by the 14th century, it was a thriving centre of commerce. Like many of Coventry's Grade I listed buildings, the city's walls were erected towards the end of the end of the 14th and the beginning of the 15th centuries. Of the 20 buildings on this list, 14 are in the city centre, and 11 date back to the 14th century. The oldest is St. Mary's Priory and cathedral, now a ruin, which was founded in 1043. Several other buildings in this list date from the 12th century. The youngest Grade I listed building in the city is the new cathedral, built in the 1950s to replace the city's second cathedral which was built in the 14th-century and elevated to cathedral status in 1918. Like much of the city centre, the city's second cathedral was almost completely destroyed in the Coventry Blitz in November 1940, and the new cathedral was built next to the ruin, which was preserved.

A 20th building, Coombe Abbey, in Coombe Country Park is owned by Coventry City Council but falls just outside the city boundary and into the Borough of Rugby in Warwickshire and thus is not included in this list.

List of buildings 

|}

See also 

 History of Coventry
 Scheduled Ancient Monuments in Coventry
 Grade II* listed buildings in Coventry

Notes

References 

Listed
Buildings and structures in Coventry
Grade I listed buildings in the West Midlands (county)
Coventry
Lists of listed buildings in the West Midlands (county)